The 2003 Deutsche Tourenwagen Masters was the seventeenth season of premier German touring car championship and also fourth season under the moniker of Deutsche Tourenwagen Masters since the series' resumption in 2000. Unlike 2002 there were ten race weekends with only one race at each event.

Changes for 2003
 The races were increased in length to a total of one hour per race, as compared to the 40 minutes each race had lasted in 2002.
 The race at Zolder, Belgium, was replaced by Adria in Italy.
 The DTM did not return to Sachsenring. Instead, Nürburgring hosted two events.
 The qualifying for Round 7 at Nürburgring was held at nighttime.

Teams and drivers
The following manufacturers, teams and drivers competed in the 2003 Deutsche Tourenwagen Masters. All teams competed with tyres supplied by Dunlop.

Race calendar and winners

Championship standings

Scoring system
Points are awarded to the top 8 classified finishers.

Drivers' championship

† — Driver retired, but was classified as they completed 90% of the winner's race distance.

Teams' championship

Manufacturers' championship

External links

 Official DTM website

Deutsche Tourenwagen Masters seasons
Deutsche Tourenwagen Masters